Urgnano is a comune (municipality) in the Province of Bergamo in the Italian region of Lombardy, located about  northeast of Milan and about  south of Bergamo.

The municipality of Urgnano contains the frazione (subdivision) Basella. Among the churches in the town are Santissima Trinità and the parish church of Santi Nazario e Celso.

Urgnano borders the following municipalities: Cavernago, Cologno al Serio, Comun Nuovo, Ghisalba, Spirano, Zanica.

Demographic evolution

References

External links
 www.comune.urgnano.bg.it